Miles Harrison is rugby union commentator for British television networks Sky Sports, Channel 4 and ITV. 

After obtaining a degree in Politics and Economic History from the University of York and a post-graduate qualification in Radio Journalism from City University London, he worked for the BBC in York and Leeds. In the early 1990s, he moved to BBC Radio Sport, commentating on rugby union, football and cricket. He was also part of the commentary team for BBC Radio's coverage of the Wimbledon tennis tournament each summer and was a regular presenter of the sports news on Today (BBC Radio 4).

In 1994, when Sky Sports secured the rights to live club rugby, Harrison was invited to be the lead commentator. Since then, he has covered six British and Irish Lions tours, seventeen  European Rugby Champions Cup finals and was named the 2007 Guinness Rugby Union Journalist of the Season. He has also been the regular commentator for England internationals, at home and abroad, and for numerous domestic club competitions. In 1997, he was the commentator on Sky's BAFTA award-winning rugby union coverage. Harrison was also the commentator on ITV Sport's BAFTA nominated rugby union coverage in 2007 and 2017.

In 2007, Harrison and his regular co-commentator Stuart Barnes were loaned out to ITV Sport to cover the Rugby World Cup.

For the 2011 Rugby World Cup both Harrison and Barnes were again loaned, this time to Sky Television in New Zealand.

In 2015, Harrison worked for ITV Sport and the World Feed television and radio coverage at the 2015 Rugby World Cup in England. His commentary on the Final was part of the biggest-ever television worldwide audience for rugby. 

In 2019, he again commentated for ITV Sport on the 2019 Rugby World Cup in Japan.

Since 2016, Harrison has been a commentator on ITV Sport's coverage of the Six Nations Championship. From 2018, he has been commentator for the Channel 4 coverage of the European Rugby Champions Cup and other international rugby.

During his time at Sky, he has also worked for Talksport as a presenter, fronting the radio station's coverage of the 1999 Rugby World Cup and the 2003 Rugby World Cup.

He has also provided the commentary for HB Studios Rugby World Cup 2011 (video game) and subsequent productions, having previously voiced other video games.

In print, Harrison has written two books for Aurum Press: Best Seat in the House – the story of the 1997 British Lions tour to South Africa and Grand Slam – a history of the Five Nations Championship. He has also ghosted the autobiography of Welsh rugby legend JPR Williams Given the Breaks.

Notes

English rugby union commentators
British sports broadcasters
Living people
Alumni of City, University of London
Year of birth missing (living people)